The office of the Housing Ombudsman is an executive non-departmental public body of the government of the United Kingdom, sponsored by the Ministry of Housing, Communities and Local Government.

The Housing Ombudsman Service looks at complaints about registered providers of social housing, for example housing associations, and other landlords, managers and agents. The service is free, independent and impartial. The Ombudsman can also look at complaints about the handling of housing issues by local councils.

In June 2018, the All-Party Parliamentary Group for Excellence in the Built Environment called on the UK government to expand the remit of independent UK ombudsman schemes to cover private house-builders. It recommended a single entry point for ombudsman services spanning the entire residential sector, which would cover the conduct of estate agents (covered by The Property Ombudsman) through to social housing. Within this overarching service, there would be either a number of specialist ombudsmen or specialist divisions – one of which would cover new homes.

References

External links 
 https://www.gov.uk/government/organisations/housing-ombudsman
 http://www.housing-ombudsman.org.uk/

Non-departmental public bodies of the United Kingdom government